Malerkotla district is a district in Punjab state of India. It was formed after the bifurcation of Sangrur district. Malerkotla district was carved out of Sangrur and became the 23rd district of Punjab on 02 June, 2021. District Malerkotla is divided into three subdivisions: Malerkotla, Amargarh and Ahmedgarh.

History 

Malerkotla was a princely state from 1657 until 20 August 1948 when it became a part of Patiala and East Punjab States Union. It was merged with Punjab in 1956 and became a part of the Sangrur district.

Administration

Malerkotla district is in the state of Punjab in northern India. It is the 23rd district in the Indian state of Punjab. The district was carved out of Sangrur district on 14 May, 2021. Subdivisions of Malerkotla, Ahmedgarh and the sub-tehsil of Amargarh are part of the district.

Demographics 
Malerkotla district has a population of 429,754 according to the 2011 census. It has an area of 684 Sq Km. It has 3 revenue divisions , municipalities & CD Blocks. There are 175 Gram Panchayats & 192 villages. 40.50% of the population lives in urban areas. Scheduled Castes make up 93,047 (21.65%) of the population.

Sikhism is the majority religion, and is mainly rural. Unlike the rest of erstwhile Punjab, the Muslims of Malerkotla did not move to Pakistan during Partition and Malerkotla still has a sizeable minority of Muslims. Hindus are the second-largest community in urban areas.

At the time of the 2011 census, 94.69% of the population spoke Punjabi and 4.21% Hindi as their first language.

Politics
Malerkotla district is part of the Malerkotla Assembly constituency. Mohammad Jamil Ur Rehman (AAP) is the MLA since 2022.

The district is part of the Sangrur Lok Sabha constituency. By-election to Sangrur Lok Sabha constituency was held on 23 June 2022 and Simranjit Singh Mann was selected as the MP.

Gallery

Monuments and attractions of Malerkotla

See also
 Malerkotla State

References

External links 

Malerkotla district
Minority Concentrated Districts in India
Districts of Punjab, India